The 1932 Mecklenburg-Schwerin state election was held on 5 June 1932 to elect the 59 members of the Landtag of the Free State of Mecklenburg-Schwerin.

Results

References 

Mecklenburg-Schwerin
Elections in Mecklenburg-Western Pomerania